The 1999 Irish local elections were held in all the counties, cities and towns of Ireland on Friday, 11 June 1999, on the same day as the European elections.

Results 

18 Workers' Party councillors had left the party in 1992 upon the creation of Democratic Left. By the 1999 elections, 16 Democratic Left councillors had merged with the Labour Party, and one Workers' Party councillor had joined Labour.

County councils

City councils

Town Councils

Borough and town councils

Borough councils

Town councils

See also 
Local government in the Republic of Ireland
:Category:Irish local government councils

Notes

References 

 
1999 elections in the Republic of Ireland
1999 in Irish politics
1999
June 1999 events in Europe